William Webbe (by 1508 – c. 1547), was an English politician. He was a Member (MP) of the Parliament of England for Huntingdon in 1529.

References

1540s deaths
People from Huntingdon
English MPs 1529–1536
Year of birth uncertain